Filip Michael Duwall Myhren (born 4 January 1993) is a Swedish badminton player who affiliate with Tjust BMK.

Achievements

BWF International Challenge/Series (2 titles, 2 runners-up) 
Men's doubles

Mixed doubles

  BWF International Challenge tournament
  BWF International Series tournament
  BWF Future Series tournament

References

External links 
 

1993 births
Living people
People from Småland
Swedish male badminton players